Bligh County was one of the original Nineteen Counties in New South Wales and is now one of the 141 Cadastral divisions of New South Wales. The Cudgegong River and the Goulburn River are its southern boundaries; the Krui River is the eastern boundary, and the Burragundy River the northern boundary. It includes the villages of Cassilis and Dunedoo.

The county was named after William Bligh, Admiral and Governor of New South Wales (1805-1808). The electoral district of Phillip, Brisbane and Bligh was the first electoral district for the area, between 1856 and 1859.

Parishes within this county
A full list of parishes found within this county; their current LGA and mapping coordinates to the approximate centre of each location is as follows:

References

Counties of New South Wales